The Coonoor block is a revenue block in the Nilgiris District of Tamil Nadu, India. It has a total of 6 panchayat villages.

References 
 

Revenue blocks of Nilgiris district